The 1966–67 Serie A season was the 33rd season of the Serie A, the top level of ice hockey in Italy. Four teams participated in the league, and SG Cortina won the championship.

Regular season

External links
 Season on hockeytime.net

1966–67 in Italian ice hockey
Serie A (ice hockey) seasons
Italy